The Awakening: Written in the Stars (alternatively titled Cravity 1st Album Part 1 [The Awakening: Written In The Stars]) is the debut studio album by South Korean boy group Cravity. It was released on August 19, 2021, by Starship Entertainment and distributed by Kakao Entertainment.

The album was a commercial success, debuting and peaking at number three on the South Korean Gaon Album Chart. The album has shipped over 145,264 physical copies in South Korea as of August 2021.

Singles
"Gas Pedal" is the title track of the studio album. The song entered and peaked at number 41 on the Gaon Download Chart on the chart issue dated week of August 15-21, 2021 and fell at number 82 on the following week of August 22–28, 2021.

The song became their second top-50 hit on the download chart, and also their second song to enter the monthly update of the chart when it peaked at 114th place.

Promotion
Music show promotions for "Gas Pedal" began on August 20, 2021, on KBS's Music Bank. The B-side track "Veni Vidi Vici" was also performed during the first week of promotions.

Commercial performance
The Awakening: Written in the Stars entered and peaked at number 3 on the Gaon Album Chart on the chart issue dated week of August 15-21, 2021. In its second week, the album fell on #9 and was ranked #51 on its third week.

The album shipped 141,588 copies at the end of August, charting at #8 on the Gaon Monthly Album Chart.

Track listing

Charts

Weekly charts

Year-end charts

Release history

References

2021 albums
Cravity albums
Starship Entertainment albums